Buschhoven is a farming village  west of Bonn, Germany. It is part of the municipality Swisttal. It is surrounded by fields and various farms, with good transport links to the nearby main cities of Bonn and Cologne. There are seasonal carnivals in the area and religious festivals where the streets are decorated- it is known for its historic community feel.

External links
 http://www.buschhoven-info.de/
 Website of the municipality Swisttal (German)

Towns in North Rhine-Westphalia